Newkirk is a village in Guadalupe County, New Mexico, United States. The community is located at the junction of Interstate 40 and New Mexico State Road 129; historic U.S. Route 66 also passes through the community. Its population was 7 as of the 2010 census. Newkirk has a post office serving ZIP Code 88431, and a service station.  It is part of the Newkirk Census Designated Place (CDP).

Newkirk was originally called Conant, it was founded in the early 20th century. In the 1930s Newkirk had four gas stations, several restaurants, De Baca's Trading Post, and a scattering of cabins.

Demographics

Education
Its school district is Santa Rosa Consolidated Schools.

Notable person
 Fabiola Cabeza de Baca Gilbert (1894-1991) - educator, nutritionist, activist, writer, inventor of the u-shaped fried taco shell.

References

External links

Census-designated places in New Mexico
Census-designated places in Guadalupe County, New Mexico
Ghost towns in New Mexico